Nirmal Biswas is an Indian politician and Member of Tripura Legislative Assembly from Khowai Assembly constituency.

See also
2018 Tripura Legislative Assembly election
2023 Tripura Legislative Assembly election

References

Living people
Tripura MLAs 2018–2023
Tripura MLAs 2023–2028
Communist Party of India (Marxist) politicians from Tripura